Felipe Salguero is a Mexican former professional boxer. He is a former WBF light flyweight champion and interim WBC Youth World light flyweight champion. Salguero is a two time world title challenger.

Regional/International Titles:
WBF Light Flyweight Champion (108 lbs)
WBC Interim Youth Light Flyweight Champion (105 lbs)

Professional boxing record 

|-
| style="text-align:center;" colspan="8"|24 Wins (14 knockouts, 10 decisions), 7 Loss, 2 Draws
|-  style="text-align:center; background:#e3e3e3;"
|  style="border-style:none none solid solid; "|Res.
|  style="border-style:none none solid solid; "|Record
|  style="border-style:none none solid solid; "|Opponent
|  style="border-style:none none solid solid; "|Type
|  style="border-style:none none solid solid; "|RoundTime
|  style="border-style:none none solid solid; "|Date
|  style="border-style:none none solid solid; "|Location
|  style="border-style:none none solid solid; "|Notes
|- align=center
|Win||24–7–2||align=left| Joan Flores
|
|
|
|align=left|
|align=left|
|- align=center
|Win||23–7–2||align=left| Pedro Palma
|
|
|
|align=left|
|align=left|

References

External links 
 

Living people
Mexican male boxers
Boxers from Baja California
Sportspeople from Tijuana
Year of birth missing (living people)